Charles H. Kloth was a Union Army soldier in the American Civil War who received the U.S. military's highest decoration, the Medal of Honor.

Outside of his military service, Kloth's life is obscure, but it is known that he was born in Europe, and entered service in Chicago, Illinois. He was awarded the Medal of Honor, for extraordinary heroism shown in Henrico County, Virginia, for bravery in action during the Battle of Vicksburg, while serving as a Private with the Chicago Mercantile Battery in the Illinois Light Artillery on May 22, 1863. His Medal of Honor was issued on July 20, 1897.

It is not known when Kloth died, or where he was buried.

Medal of Honor citation

References

External links

Date of birth unknown
Date of death unknown
Year of birth unknown
Year of death unknown
American Civil War recipients of the Medal of Honor
Foreign-born Medal of Honor recipients
People from Chicago
People of Illinois in the American Civil War
Union Army soldiers
United States Army Medal of Honor recipients